Kacanka is a river in south central Poland. It's a tributary of the Koprzywianka (at Bazów), which in turn is a tributary of the Vistula near Sandomierz.
Kacanka is known for its fishing, with trout, perch, crucian carp, and roach being common catches.

Rivers of Poland
Rivers of Świętokrzyskie Voivodeship
Fishing in Poland